Samuel Doyle Nave (July 12, 1915 – December 10, 1990) was an American football player and coach. He was known for coming off the bench and throwing the game-winning touchdown in the 1939 Rose Bowl. He was drafted 6th overall by the Detroit Lions but did not play for them. Afterwards he was the head coach of the Hawaii Polar Bears, a minor-league team.

Early life 
Doyle Nave was born on July 12, 1915 in Bedford County, Pennsylvania.

College career 
Nave went to college at USC. He played on their freshmen team in 1936. From 1937 to 1939, he was one of their backup quarterbacks.

1939 Rose Bowl 
In the 1939 Rose Bowl, he came off the bench with little time left and threw 4 straight completed passes to tight end Al Krueger. His fourth pass was completed for a touchdown with seconds remaining to beat the Duke Blue Devils 7–3. It was the only points Duke allowed all season. Nave and Krueger were named MVPs and later were inducted into the Rose Bowl Hall of Fame.

He later pursued track and high jumping.

Professional career

Detroit Lions 
In 1940 Nave was drafted 6th overall by the Detroit Lions but he did not play for them.

Hollywood Bears and Hawaii Polar Bears 
After being drafted by the Lions, he became the Head Coach of the Hawaii Polar Bears, a minor league team. He played for them and also played shortly with the Hollywood Bears.

Death 
Nave died on December 10, 1990 at the age of 75.

Further reading
REMEMBERING : DOYLE NAVE : Passage of Time Doesn't Diminish Rose Bowl Heroics
Clipped From The Los Angeles Times

References

1915 births
1990 deaths
USC Trojans football players
American football quarterbacks
Players of American football from Pennsylvania